Vasile Marius Curileac (born 18 February 1984) is a Romanian professional footballer who plays as a goalkeeper. In his career, Curileac played for teams such as Unirea Dej, Cetatea Suceava, FC Botoșani or ACS Poli Timișoara, among others.

Honours

Dante Botoșani 
Liga III: 2021–22

References

External links
 
 

1984 births
Living people
Sportspeople from Satu Mare
Romanian footballers
Association football goalkeepers
Liga I players
Liga II players
Liga III players
FC Unirea Dej players
CSM Unirea Alba Iulia players
ACS Sticla Arieșul Turda players
AS Voința Snagov players
FC Botoșani players
CS Concordia Chiajna players
ACS Poli Timișoara players